The following is a list of cast members of the British semi-reality television programme Made in Chelsea.

Current cast
This is a list of the current cast members appearing in the show in order of their first appearance.

Former cast
This is a list of the former cast members appearing in the show in order of their last appearance.

Duration of cast

Cast changes
Amber Atheton, Binky Felstead, Caggie Dunlop, Cheska Hull, Francis Boulle, Fredrik, Funda Onal, Gabriella Ellis, Hugo Taylor, Mark-Francis, Millie Mackintosh, Ollie Locke, Rosie Fortescue and Spencer Matthews all made their first appearances in the first episode of the first series, whilst Agne joined the cast in the second episode after she was hired to be Francis’ intern. Louise Thompson appeared briefly during the fifth episode to advise Funda on her relationship with Spencer, but did not appear for the remainder of the series. Funda left the series after 6 episodes following the breakdown of her relationship with Spencer, and Agne left during the final episode of the series after resigning from being Francis' intern. The second series featured a few changes in the cast. Louise returned to the show despite having other commitments in Edinburgh causing her to be absent from some episodes. Chloe Green, Jamie Laing and Victoria Baker-Harber also made their debut during the first episode. Alice Davidson, a cousin of Caggie, joined the show during the seventh episode, however she quit after the Christmas special airing after the second series. Chloe also decided to quit the show following her split with Ollie and did not return for the third series.

The third series began in 2012 and featured new arrivals to the cast including Richard Dinan, Kimberley Garner and Natalie Joel. Gabilicious Tristao appeared in the first episode of the series but did not feature for the remainder. This was the last series to feature many original cast members including Amber Atherton, who only appeared for two episodes this series, as well as Caggie Dunlop, who again only appeared briefly, and Hugo Taylor. Despite the arrival of Natalie at the beginning of the series, this was the only series she appeared in as she did not return for the next. The first episode of the fourth series saw the arrivals of new cast members Sam Cussins, Stevie Johnson and Andy Jordan, whilst Sophia Sassoon was introduced in the third episode. Carly Rothman and Lucy Watson both made their arrivals during the fifth episode, and Ashley James made her first appearance in the ninth episode. However, during the Christmas special episode at the end of the series original cast member Gabriella announced she'd be leaving the series. This episode was also the final episode to feature Fredrik, and Sophia and Sam, who departed after one series.

In 2013, several new cast members were introduced during Series 5. Sisters Fran and Olivia Newman Young, Phoebe-Lettice Thompson all made their first appearance during the first episode of the series, while Josh Acoombs made his debut during the second episode as an ex-boyfriend of Phoebe. This, however, is the only series to feature Josh as he did not return for Series 6. Ollie's friend Oscar Ligenza briefly joined the series appearing in just 5 episodes. Alex Mytton arrived during the eighth episode. The last episode of the series was the final episode to feature original cast members Ollie and Millie, as well as Richard who had appeared from the third series onwards. Ashley also made her final appearance during this series. Series 6 saw the introduction of Sam Thompson, Sophie Hermann and Stephanie Pratt who all had connections with already established cast members with Sam being Louise's brother, Sophie being Victoria's friend and Stephanie being Spencer's then-girlfriend. Olivia departed the series after only appearing in the first episode, whilst the final episode of the series seen the departures of Phoebe, and original cast member Francis.

The seventh series in 2014 saw no new cast members arrive until the fourth episode where Sam Thompson's ex-girlfriend Riley Uggla was introduced as well as her friend Aurelie Mason-Perez. Stephanie also returned during this episode after only appearing in the previous series as a guest. Ed "Fordy" Ford made his debut during the sixth episode and later went on to date Louise, and Georgia "Toff" Toffolo arrived during the seventh episode. This was the only series to feature Aurelie and Fordy after they decided not to return. The group took to New York City for a special series, which saw the introduction of Alik Alfus and Billie Carroll during the first episode, and Jules Hamilton in the second. Cheska decided to return to London during the second episode. This was later confirmed as her final episode as she did not return for the eighth series. Gabriella Ellis also made a one-off return during the third episode. The series featured all of the Chelsea cast, however, there were notable absences from Andy, Sophie and Toff, who returned during the eighth series. Whilst Alik remained returned following the NYC specials, both Billie and Jules did not. The eighth series began in October and featured the arrival of both Lonan O'Herlihy and Will Colebrook in the first episode as well as Tiffany Watson, who is the sister of already established cast member Lucy. George Amor was introduced during the second episode as a new love interest of Victoria. Josh Shepherd made his first appearance for the show during the fifth episode of the series as a friend of Stevie, and Lauren Frazer-Hutton debuted during the ninth episode as Spencer's new girlfriend. Despite no official word of their departures from the show, Will and George did not return for the ninth series.

Ahead of the ninth series in 2015, it was confirmed that five new cast members had been added to the show. These included Emily Weller, Jess Woodley, Millie Wilkinson, Fleur Irving and Josh "JP" Patterson, who are all already friends of already established cast members. This is also the first series to include Nicola Hughes, who joined the series as the girlfriend of Alex, as well as new cast members James Dunmore and Elliot Cross. The ninth series was the last to include long-serving cast member Andy Jordan, who left to pursue a music career. Stevie Johnson, who appeared alongside Jordan from Series 4, announced his departure in August 2015. Another long-serving cast member Spencer Matthews left the show on 16 November 2015.

References

External links
 

Made in Chelsea
Made in Chelsea
Made in Chelsea cast members